Meron Russom (born 12 March 1987 in Asmara) is an Eritrean cyclist who last rode for MTN-Qhubeka.

Palmares

2010
African Team Time Trial Champion (with Ferekalsi Debesay, Daniel Teklehaimanot and Tesfai Teklit)
2nd African Road Race Championships
2nd Tour of Libya
2011
1st Tour of Eritrea
1st stage 2
2012
2nd La Tropicale Amissa Bongo
2nd National Time Trial Championships
2013
African Team Time Trial Champion (with Natnael Berhane, Daniel Teklehaimanot and Meron Teshome)
2nd National Time Trial Championships

References

1987 births
Living people
Eritrean male cyclists
21st-century Eritrean people